Nick Jr. is a British pay television channel owned and operated by a Paramount Networks UK & Australia. The channel is aimed at pre-school children.

History
Nick Jr. was first broadcast in the UK and Ireland on 1 September 1993 during the daytime hours from 9 a.m. to 12 p.m. on weekdays on Nickelodeon, though these hours varied over time, particularly when Nick Jr. aired in a breakfast slot in the summer holidays, Its programming was a mix of shows from the US version of Nick Jr and other imported shows, Later in the block's existence, syndicated British children's programmes would be a main focus of the channel as well. Its identity followed that of the US feed of the block as well. By the late 1990's it was mostly broadcast between 10 a.m. to 2:30 p.m.

On 10 June 1999, it was announced that the block would be spun off into a channel, and its new branding was being finalised. The channel launched on 1 September 1999 as the world's first dedicated preschoolers' channel. On the Astra 1B satellite of Sky's analogue satellite service, the new channel timeshared with Sky Sports 3 and broadcast between 6am and 10am, although this schedule would sometimes be altered if sports were being covered in the early morning. On digital satellite and cable, Nick Jr. aired from 6 a.m. to 7 p.m. A spinoff of the recently-launched American Noggin channel was proposed to timeshare with Nick Jr., but this never materialised.

The Nick Jr. block on Nickelodeon continued until July 2000, before it was closed due to the high uptake of Sky Digital. On 31 August 2000, Nick Jr ceased broadcasting on analogue satellite.

On 3 September 2001, MTV Dance started broadcasting during Nick Jr's downtime hours after it was spun off from MTV Extra.

The channel refreshed on 4 February 2002 – Dora the Explorer, The Hoobs and the channel's first homegrown produced series "You Do Too" had their premieres the same day of the rebrand.

On 19 July 2002, the channel moved its EPG slot on Sky to make way for the incoming Nicktoons channel.

On 13 August 2002, MTV Dance acquired its own separate channel. By December, Nick Jr.  had gained another hour at the end of the broadcasting day, now operating from 6 a.m. to 8 p.m.

On 31 May 2004, Nick Jr extended its runtime to end at 10 p.m., in order to launch Noggin, a block that showed classic British children's TV programmes from 8 p.m. to 10 p.m., causing the exodus of these shows from the main daytime schedule leaving more space for new shows.

On 5 September 2005, the Noggin block was changed to Nick Jr Classics as part of a channel-wide refresh (see Identity). The Backyardigans had its linear UK premiere the same day of the rebrand.

A version of Nick Jr. for Ireland was launched in 2006. This version, like the Irish version of Nickelodeon, shares the same schedule as the British version of the channel but has Irish adverts.

On 30 January 2006, a spinoff of the American Noggin, as a block showing Nick Jr programmes on free-to-air sister channel TMF from 7 am to 9 am. It was promoted on Nick Jr.

On 24 April 2006, Nick Jr. 2 was launched, initially as a 1-hour timeshift of the main channel, but a few months later, this format was dropped and it became an alternative channel with a completely new schedule, but with Nick Jr. Classics at the same hours.

On 25 September 2006, TMF rebranded its Noggin block as Nick Jr on TMF.

Following the removal of Nick Jr. Classics from the main Nick Jr. channel on 4 January 2009, normal programming ran to 6 a.m. to 10 p.m. The block would continue on Nick Jr 2. until July 2010, after which classic British children's shows ceased to be part of the network's library entirely.

In early 2009, TMF reverted its Nick Jr block back to Noggin, and it broadcast until March 2010 before it was shut down permanently, at which point TMF had been replaced by VIVA.

On 2 August 2010, Nick Jr. began broadcasting 24/7, with many old shows from the 2000s being re-added to fill the schedule.

In July 2011, Nick Jr. 2 briefly shifted its sign-on to 5 a.m., but this was reverted back to a 6 a.m. sign on a month later.

A 1-hour timeshift named Nick Jr. +1 launched on 2 October 2012 replacing Nicktoons Replay.

By July 2013, Nick Jr. 2 had begun broadcasting 21 hours from 3 a.m. to 12 p.m., with teleshopping off air.

On 3 November 2014, Nick Jr. 2 was renamed Nick Jr. Too and it began broadcasting 24/7.

On 5 July 2016, Nick Jr. HD launched on Sky, replacing MTV Live HD's Sky slot.

On 31 October 2022, Sky sold its stake in Nickelodeon UK, including Nick Jr., to Paramount.

Availability

Cable
Virgin Media : Channel 715

Online
Now TV: Watch live

Satellite
Sky : Channel 606 (HD), Channel 622 (+1) & Channel 645 (SD)
Sky : Channel 606 (SD), Channel 622 (+1) & Channel 625 (HD)

Terrestrial
BT : Channel 470 (SD) and Channel 476 (HD)

Identity 

Between the launch of the block in 1993 and the launch of the channel in 1999, Nick Jr UK's branding largely mirrored that of the American feed, and used the American version's idents. The UK input was presented by Dave Benson Phillips and Teresa Gallagher throughout the mid-1990s, who were joined by two mascots called Bugsy and Herbie, who eventually went onto present the block by themselves until they were replaced by Face from 1997 until September 2005 and was dubbed into British English by David Holt.

Upon the channel's launch in 1999, it launched its own package featuring live action children playing in a brightly painted studio or holding posters on which clips of programmes appeared. From the channel's launch, Face's hosting job would be shared by the Early Worms, the titular characters of the Early Worms show, Arnie and Barnie. Due to the abundance of British-produced content along with the channel's status as the first dedicated for preschoolers in the UK, the channel positioned itself in a special British image in its early years. Starting in September 2000, just before signing off for the night, it would air a bedtime segment and song hosted by Kevin Duala (host of the British version of Blue's Clues), titled Bedtime Business.

In 2001, the channel transitioned into using Nick Jr. US's ident package, first with up-next bumpers, and combinations of the 1999 idents with idents from the US.

On 4 February 2002, Nick Jr. fully revamped into the new package, which had a specific jingle and song played in idents. These idents usually consisted of children playing around or dancing, this time in the outdoors, and the logo appeared in a white circle on a plain brightly-coloured background at the end.  On some occasions, they would broadcast atmospheric idents which included babies. Sometimes these idents would take up half the ad breaks, or sometimes they appeared in split-screen graphics and next bumpers. Promo endboards were added as well.

Dora the Explorer and The Hoobs had their premieres the same day of the rebrand. Before closing down at 7 p.m. (8 p.m. after Autumn 2002), it would air the Bedtime Business segment, followed by a short closedown bumper featuring some characters from Nick Jr. shows and an announcement telling viewers to resume watching at 6 a.m., before cutting to a static yellow screen with the characters and the broadcast times until 6 a.m. the next morning. In Autumn 2002, they updated their DOG to a much cleaner, organised and less opaque state.

Just before Noggin signed on, an ident showing the logo as two caterpillars played during the last advertisement break at 8 p.m. Then in 2005, this was supplemented with a sting ident of the Nick Jr. and Noggin logos flipping back and forth. After Noggin finished airing, it would play an ident of a UFO flying away, and cut to a dark blue version of the 2002 signoff screen, just telling viewers to come back at 6 a.m.

In July 2004, some in-vision morning presenters were introduced to the network. Neal Wright (Zak) and Jennifer Johnston (Jen) presented and hosted this block simply called "The Garden." Alongside them, there was a puppet plant called Bud, and a blue ball of light/firefly named Izzy.

Also around this period in 2004, Nick Jr. started to use the 2D American animal idents originally introduced there in 2003. It is unknown when they stopped showing them. At the same time, Nick Jr. reeled in the new look of Face to their channel introduced in America the year prior, usually referred to as "Modern Face". He was still voiced by David Holt. Nick Jr. made the unusual decision to not drop the original Face, leaving Modern Face and Face's old look broadcasting simultaneously, much to the confusion of viewers. The UK-dubbed version of Modern Face is extremely hard to come across.

In the spring of 2005, a new animated presenter appeared on the channel alongside Face at the time. This was Piper O'Possum, who presented the UK input of Nick Jr. until its rebrand on 30 April 2010. She was re-dubbed by Alex Kelly and lasted longer on the UK feed than in the US by three years. Between this time and 4 September 2005, a mix of Old Face, Modern Face, Piper, The Garden and the Early Worms hosted the channel.

During the rebrand on 5 September 2005, all presenters and mascots except Piper O'Possum were dropped. Piper became the main presenter for most of the day, but in the late afternoons she got taken off for the rest of the remaining hours and her segments of announcing shows usually got replaced with normal next bumpers. In addition, Noggin changed its name to Nick Jr. Classics and the ident package that had been used since 2002 was dropped, as the international versions of Nick Jr. launched a 2D-3D animated pop-up-book-style ident package, with two animals (a parent and a child) forming the Nick Jr. logo, very similar to the package of Nick Jr. on CBS from 2004 to 2006. This package was designed by British animation studio Studio AKA. At night, the idents would have a dark backdrop. At the end of regular Nick Jr. programmes on both channels, they played the new bedtime song, "Jimmer Jammers", showed a sign-off ident telling viewers to come back at 6 a.m., and transitioned to Nick Jr. Classics. After Nick Jr Classics, they would cut to a night loop of the same ident or different idents playing over again.

Idents on Nick Jr. 2 had the number "2" appear at the end of each ident in the scenery. On its launch on 25 September 2006, Nick Jr. on TMF began using the idents. The package would be used on both Nick Jr. channels until 29 April 2010.  During the time when Nick Jr, Nick Jr 2. and Nick Jr. on TMF co-existed, the three cross-promoted their programmes under the slogan "Three ways to play".

Between 2008 and 2014, the schedule after 6 p.m. was rebranded as "Nick Jr. Bedtime". A new bedtime look and song (Land of Dreams) was commissioned and played alongside the already existing night version of the 2005 idents and its song (Jimmer Jammers). The Early Worms returned as hosts for the strand (and eventually the last hosts of any Nick Jr. feed internationally). During the strand, special celebrity guests would accompany Arnie and Barnie in reading bedtime stories, akin to those of CBeebies.

On 30 April 2010, Nick Jr. rebranded to a variant of the United States look and French look designed in-house. They used the animated American idents along with their own which included still shots of children in assorted places or doing things like letting go of a balloon, or being at a picnic. Like the American rebrand, it was based on the old arts-and-crafts style and music of Noggin, and was used as the basis for the rebrands of the mainland European Nick Jr. feeds. Moose and Zee were brought over from the American Nick Jr. channel and the former Noggin block on Viva (which had been axed as part of the rebrand) to host the main Nick Jr. channel, with Moose's voice being dubbed by David Holt (voice actor). Just like on the US version of Nick Jr., Moose and Zee presented links between programmes and especially around up-next bumpers, although due to the need for advertisement space, they appeared irregularly and not at night, where they would be replaced by regular next bumpers.

Nick Jr. Classics was rebranded and then discontinued in July of that year. When Nick Jr. and Nick Jr. 2 signed off, they cut to an off-air slide, and then played a night loop of the same ident repeating, but the actual sign-off has not been found yet.

On 2 August 2010, when the main Nick Jr. stopped signing off, the Bedtime block was truncated to an 8 p.m. finish. When Nick Jr. 2 expanded its broadcast hours, it broadcast the segment from 7 p.m. to 9 p.m.

However, on 7 January 2013, the channel rebranded again to the next United States look, which dropped Moose and Zee and the arts-and-craft style branding in favour of a 3D CGI world appearing in bumpers and promos where clips of the characters appeared. The Bedtime strand was also revamped under this branding. There were also slight variations between the colour schemes on Nick Jr. and Nick Jr. 2, with the later opting for a colder colour palette. However, some of the 2010 idents, especially the Christmas ones, were retained until December 2014, albeit with the new Nick Jr. endcap (of the logo changing colour multiple times).

While it was initially the same as the United States version, on 3 November 2014, the branding on the main channel was refreshed by Blue Zoo, and the Bedtime strand was dropped from both channels, leaving the channel without any hosts for the first time in 19 years. This new branding used CGI and 3D shapes like the previous one and used standard colour schemes for different parts of the day. Nick Jr. Too, however, retained the old style until 2019.

On 18 February 2019, Nick Jr. dropped the "Smart Place to Play" look in favour of the "Ready to Play" branding adopted in the United States the previous year, featuring live-action children running in a 3D CGI space, often holding bubble wands in which clips of shows appear out of. Bumpers also show these children interacting with the Nick Jr. characters in live-action environments.

TMF/Viva block 
A version of the US Noggin branding was used for the Noggin block on TMF/Viva. It was visibly stripped-back from the American version but still very similar. It was hosted by Moose A. Moose and Zee D. Bird from the American version, with Moose  dubbed over by David Holt.

Slogans 

 Grow, Learn and Play (1 September 1993 – 1995)
 Just for me! (1 September 1999 – 3 February 2002)
 Join in!/Join-in TV/Join the Fun! (4 February 2002 – 29 April 2010)
 It's the shows that make Nick Jr. (2010) 
 Every day's an adventure (7 January 2013 – 17 February 2019)

Other related services

Nick Jr. Too/Nick Jr. 2

Another channel, Nick Jr. 2, was launched on 24 April 2006. When it launched, the idents and branding were just the same as the main channel. The differences were that logos on promo endboards and promos, in general, had a 2 included next to them. This also was used in the next bumpers and general idents. Nick Jr. 2 was initially supposed to work like a +1 channel, but later reran old shows that the main channel didn't air like I Spy or Sali Mali.

Later on, it showed its own exclusive programmes, and it was advertised as such. Examples of this are It's A Big Big World, the second season of Wow! Wow! Wubbzy!, and the Nick Jr. Classics block after it left the main channel. When it changed its name to Nick Jr. Too on 3 November 2014, it also started broadcasting 24 hours a day.

Since October 2013, the channel has occasionally aired long-term marathons (usually one month) of the British preschool series Peppa Pig, during which it rebrands itself as Nick Jr. Peppa. The channel has since broadcast marathons of the Canadian preschool series PAW Patrol in a similar manner, likewise rebranding as Nick Jr. PAW Patrol.

Unlike the main channel, Nick Jr. Too  is not available on TalkTalk, Eir TV or WightFibre.

Noggin/Nick Jr. Classics

During the mid and late 2000s, Nick Jr. and Nick Jr. 2 presented a nighttime programming block dedicated to classic British children's programmes from the 1970s and 1980s under the title Nick Jr. Classics. The block launched under the name Noggin on 31 May 2004, running every night from 8 p.m. - 10 p.m. It was rebranded as Nick Jr. Classics on 5 September 2005.

The block was discontinued on Nick Jr. on 4 January 2009 and on Nick Jr. 2 in mid-late 2010.

Noggin/Nick Jr. on TMF/Viva 
Noggin started broadcasting on 30 January 2006, the first international feed of Noggin (excluding the former vintage block on Nick Jr. which only had the name in common). It was a children's television slot broadcast on TMF from 07:00 to 09:00 daily. It showed a selection of Nick Jr shows and often promoted the main channels to viewers with only Freeview and therefore were not subscribed to Nick Jr..

Nick Jr on TMF had replaced the strand Noggin on 25 September 2006, but its programming remained identical. It is unknown why the rebrand happened, but it may have been to consolidate the brand after the launch of Nick Jr. 2. It used the same ident and presentation package as its main sister channel, Nick Jr. Moose and Zee's segments were removed as well. Programmes shown included Maggie and the Ferocious Beast, Dora the Explorer, The Backyardigans, Thomas & Friends, Blue's Clues, LazyTown, Go Diego Go!, Little Bill amongst others. The channels continued to cross promote each other, including showing next bumpers for all three at once.

It was reverted to Noggin in early 2009. The final set of programmes shown were Go Diego Go!, Dora the Explorer, Little Bear, Bruno and Maggie and the Ferocious Beast. In its final year, Noggin received almost zero cross-promotion from Nick Jr., not even on its website.

Noggin was the first commercial children's television channel launched on 30 January 2006 on TMF to air on the UK's DTT platform, Freeview, followed by CITV, then lastly Playhouse Disney Disney Channel on ABC1.

Following the closure of TMF, the block continued on Viva until March 2010, when the Nick Jr. rebrand caused Noggin to shut down. However, the branding of Noggin (except the name "Noggin") and the Moose and Zee segments were adopted by Nick Jr. and used until January 2013.

Programming

See also
 Nickelodeon (British and Irish TV channel)
 Nicktoons (British and Irish TV channel)
 Nick at Nite international versions#UK and Ireland
 Nicktoonsters

References

External links
 

UK and Ireland
Children's television channels in the United Kingdom
Television channels and stations established in 1999
Sky television channels
1999 establishments in Ireland
Television channel articles with incorrect naming style